Oleg Khakimbekovich Shirinbekov (born 11 September 1963 in Shakhrinau) is a Tajikistani football coach and a former football player for Soviet and Tajikistan national teams. He is an assistant coach for the Russian club Torpedo-2.

Career

Club Career

Shirinbekov was born in Shakhrinau, then Tajik SSR, which was part of the Soviet Union. He began his career in Dushanbe with local side Pamir Dushanbe. In 1984, he was selected to play for the first team. 

After 97 matches with Pamir, where he scored 11 goals, in 1987, Shirinbekov was signed by Moscow-based Torpedo Moscow from the top level of Soviet football. In Torpedo, Shirinbekov established himself as a regular starter and became one of Torpedo’s most important players. His stay at the club was also coincidental with Torpedo’s golden period, when the team was among the leading clubs in the league. He was also part of the Torpedo side which reached the quarterfinal of the 1990–91 UEFA Cup. Shirinbekov scored a memorable goal for Torpedo in the second leg of the quarterfinal against Brøndby, when he scored in the 87th minute to equalize in the second leg played in Moscow. Torpedo were, however, eliminated after a penalty shootout.

In 1991, Shirinbekov signed a contract with Hungarian club Vasas SC from Budapest. He spent three seasons in Vasas, amassing 85 appearances.

In 1994, Shirinbekov returned to Torpedo for two seasons, where he made 42 appearances. After the 1994 season, Shirinbekov retired from football. However, in 1998, he returned on the pitch, signing a contract with FC Torpedo-ZIL Moscow, which was a newly established team with the intention of replacing the original Torpedo, who were in financial problems. He played 28 games and scored one goal.

International
Shirinbekov made his debut for USSR on 21 November 1988 in a friendly against Syria.

Managerial
Shirinbekov was sacked as Istiqlol Dushanbe manager in January 2014.

References

  Profile

1963 births
Living people
People from Districts of Republican Subordination
Soviet footballers
Soviet Union international footballers
Soviet expatriate footballers
Expatriate footballers in Hungary
Tajikistani footballers
Tajikistani expatriate footballers
Tajikistani expatriate sportspeople in Hungary
CSKA Pamir Dushanbe players
FC Torpedo Moscow players
Soviet Top League players
Russian Premier League players
Vasas SC players
FC Moscow players
Tajikistani football managers
Tajikistan international footballers
Dual internationalists (football)
Association football midfielders